Kyle McCord may refer to:

Kyle McCord (soccer) (born 1992), American soccer player
Kyle McCord (American football) (born 2002), American football player